Brock Creek may refer to:
Brock Creek (Missouri), a stream in Missouri
Brock Creek (Buck Creek tributary), a stream in Pennsylvania